This is a list of castles in Namibia.

Namibia
Castles
Namibia
Castles